We've Got Each Other is an American television sitcom that aired on CBS from October 1, 1977, to January 7, 1978.

Premise
The television series follows the lives of the Hibbard couple dealing with neighbors, work, and life in general. In this show, the roles of domestic housewife and working business man are reversed. Judy is the bread winner of the small family.

Stuart Hibbard (Oliver Clark), who works from home and writes for a mail order catalogue ("Herman Gutman Mail Order Catalogs") is married to Judy Hibbard (Beverly Archer) who works as an office manager for forgetful photographer Damon Jerome (Tom Poston). Both Judy and Stuart had a nemesis in their daily lives: self-centered model, Dee Dee Baldwin (Joan Van Ark) was Judy's, and their next door neighbor, Ken Redford (Martin Kove) was Stuart's.

Cast
Oliver Clark as Stuart Hibbard
Beverly Archer as Judy Hibbard
Tom Poston as Damon Jerome
Joan Van Ark as Dee Dee
Ren Woods as Donna
Martin Kove as Ken

Production
The show was created by Tom Patchett and Jay Tarses for MTM Enterprises and CBS, it aired Saturdays following The Bob Newhart Show (also produced by MTM Enterprises), replacing The Mary Tyler Moore Show. The show did not garner critical or commercial success, with cancellation coming after just 13 episodes. At the time, Tarses was quoted in TV Guide as saying he wouldn’t have watched it if he’d been a viewer: “I have better things to do with my time.”

Episodes

Show Clips
1977 CBS promos
Opening Credits

References

External links

1977 American television series debuts
1978 American television series endings
1970s American sitcoms
English-language television shows
CBS original programming
Television shows set in Los Angeles
Television series about marriage
Television series by MTM Enterprises
Television series created by Tom Patchett